The Men's Greco-Roman 52 kg at the 1984 Summer Olympics as part of the wrestling program were held at the Anaheim Convention Center, Anaheim, California.

Medalists

Tournament results 
The wrestlers are divided into 2 groups. The winner of each group decided by a double-elimination system. 
Legend
TF — Won by Fall
ST — Won by Technical Superiority, 12 points difference
PP — Won by Points, 1-7 points difference, the loser with points
PO — Won by Points, 1-7 points difference, the loser without points
SP — Won by Points, 8-11 points difference, the loser with points
SO — Won by Points, 8-11 points difference, the loser without points
P0 — Won by Passivity, scoring zero points
P1 — Won by Passivity, while leading by 1-7 points
PS — Won by Passivity, while leading by 8-11 points
DC — Won by Decision, 0-0 score
PA — Won by Opponent Injury
DQ — Won by Forfeit
DNA — Did not appear
L — Losses
ER — Round of Elimination
CP — Classification Points
TP — Technical Points

Eliminatory round

Group A

Group B

Final round

Final standings

References

External links
Official Report

Greco-Roman 52kg